The 1994 German motorcycle Grand Prix was the sixth round of the 1994 Grand Prix motorcycle racing season. It took place on 12 June 1994 at the Hockenheimring.

500 cc classification

 John Kocinski (broken hand) & Luca Cadalora (hand) withdrew from the event following crashes in practice.

250 cc classification

125 cc classification

References

German motorcycle Grand Prix
German
Motorcycle Grand Prix